Maureen McKenna Goldberg is an American jurist who is currently the senior justice of the Rhode Island Supreme Court.

Education 
Goldberg attended St. Mary Academy – Bay View, a college preparatory school in Riverside, Rhode Island, where she graduated from in 1969. She went on to receive her undergraduate education from Providence College, graduating in 1973. Goldberg is a 1978 graduate of Suffolk University Law School in Boston

Career 
Goldberg was an Assistant Attorney General in the Criminal Division from 1978 to 1984. She served as South Kingstown Town Solicitor from 1985 to 1987 and as Westerly Town Solicitor from 1987 to 1990. In 1990, Goldberg served as Acting Town Manager of Westerly.

From July 1990 to May 1997, Goldberg served as an associate justice of the Rhode Island Superior Court. In 1997, she was appointed by Governor Lincoln Almond to serve on the Rhode Island Supreme Court.

Personal life 
Goldberg is married to Robert Goldberg, a lobbyist and former Republican leader in the Rhode Island Senate.

References

External links
Supreme Court Justice Profile Rhode Island Secretary of State
Engendering Equality Suffolk University Law School Alumni Magazine

Suffolk University Law School alumni
Justices of the Rhode Island Supreme Court
Providence College alumni
Living people
20th-century American judges
21st-century American judges
Year of birth missing (living people)
20th-century American women judges
21st-century American women judges